In quantum field theory the vacuum expectation value (also called condensate or simply VEV) of an operator is its average or expectation value in the vacuum. The vacuum expectation value of an operator O is usually denoted by  One of the most widely used examples of an observable physical effect that results from the vacuum expectation value of an operator is the Casimir effect.

This concept is important for working with correlation functions in quantum field theory. It is also important in spontaneous symmetry breaking. Examples are:
The Higgs field has a vacuum expectation value of 246 GeV. This nonzero value underlies the Higgs mechanism of the Standard Model. It is also near the limit of the most massive nuclei, at v = 264.3 Da.
The chiral condensate in quantum chromodynamics, about a factor of a thousand smaller than the above, gives a large effective mass to quarks, and distinguishes between phases of quark matter. This underlies the bulk of the mass of most hadrons.
The gluon condensate in quantum chromodynamics may also be partly responsible for masses of hadrons.

The observed Lorentz invariance of space-time allows only the formation of condensates which are Lorentz scalars and have vanishing charge. Thus fermion condensates must be of the form , where ψ is the fermion field.

In some vacua of string theory, however, non-scalar condensates are found. If these describe our universe, then Lorentz symmetry violation may be observable.

See also
 Wightman axioms
 Correlation function (quantum field theory)
 Vacuum energy
 Dark energy
 Spontaneous symmetry breaking

References 

Quantum field theory
Standard Model